Murieta is a 1965 American biographical Western film directed by George Sherman and starring Jeffrey Hunter, Diana Lorys, Sara Lezana and Sancho Gracia. The film is about Joaquin Murrieta.

Plot

Cast

References

1965 films
1965 Western (genre) films
1960s biographical films
American Western (genre) films
American biographical films
Associated British Picture Corporation
Biographical films about people of the American Old West
Films directed by George Sherman
Films shot in Spain
Warner Bros. films
1960s American films